Isabel Bassett Wasson (January 11, 1897 – February 21, 1994) was one of the first female petroleum geologists in the United States, the first female ranger at Yellowstone National Park, and also one of the first interpretive rangers (male or female) hired by the National Park Service.

Biography

Wasson was born Isabel Deming Bassett in Brooklyn, NY on January 11, 1897, daughter of urban planner Edward Bassett and Annie Preston Bassett, and sister of inventor and engineer Preston Bassett. Wasson graduated Phi Beta Kappa from Wellesley College in 1918, majoring in history so she could take a wide range of science courses. She took classes in geology after graduation at the University of Chicago and the Massachusetts Institute of Technology. She met her future husband, petroleum geologist Theron Wasson, whom she married in 1920, while working towards a master's degree in geology at Columbia University, which she finished in 1934. They had three children: Elizabeth W. Bergstrom, a biologist; Edward B. Wasson, a petroleum geologist; and Anne Harney Gallagher, an art historian. Wasson worked as a petroleum geologist in her husband's office at the Pure Oil Company from the early 1920s until 1928. She published two scholarly articles on geology, one co-authored with her husband about an oil field discovered by Pure Oil in 1914, and another by herself about the ages of rock formations in Ohio and new terminology for them; the latter was cited in a number of other papers and a recent book. After 1928 she spent over 50 years in River Forest, IL, teaching science in the local public schools, lecturing, bird watching (ornithology), and mentoring generations of young naturalists. She was quoted in this 1986 Chicago Tribune article as an expert on local geology at age 89. She was honored for her contributions to local history in 1982 when the Wasson Room was named after her in a local school to hold local history resources. Her interests included archaeology; she discovered a Native American religious mound in Thatcher Woods, near her house in River Forest, in the 1930s. An article about her discovery called her "the one who started the environmental education movement in America back in the 1920s and '30s." Theron and Isabel divorced in 1953 and she did not remarry. From 1953–1954, Wasson served as President of the Chicago Ornithological Society.  Wasson also taught classes at the Morton Arboretum in Lisle, Illinois. She died in La Grange Park, IL, in 1994.

Wasson became one of the first interpretive rangers hired by the National Park Service, and the second ranger and first female ranger at Yellowstone National Park. She was hired when Horace Albright, then the Park Superintendent, heard her lecture on geology to a group of her family and friends who were visiting the park in the summer of 1919 on a tour of national parks organized by the Brooklyn Daily Eagle. Albright invited her to return in the summer of 1920 to lead interpretive tours and give lectures about the geology of the park, which she did. After she was hired she wrote to the Wellesley alumnae magazine, "Next summer I am to be a ranger in Yellowstone Park. You never heard of a woman ranger? Well, neither have I." She gave over 200 public talks on the geology of the park that summer, and is credited with setting the template for interpretive talks by NPS rangers. Albright also asked her to train the hotel bellhops to give talks similar to hers, but she concluded that they lacked the background in geology to do this. She suggested instead that the park hire college students on summer break to give talks, and this became a tradition at Yellowstone and many other parks. Albright invited her to return again in the summer of 1921, but she declined because she was pregnant. She inquired about returning in 1922 but others had been hired to do similar work.

References

Further reading 

Kaufman, Polly Welts. National Parks and the Woman's Voice: A History. (Albuquerque: University of New Mexico Press, 1997, and 2nd edition, 2006)
Wasson, Isabel B. A Village Grows up on a Sandbar. Forest Leaves (River Forest, Ill.), June 22, 1977.
Geologist unveils underground 'river' mystery. Oak Leaves (Oak Park, Ill.), 1952. Summarized here: http://www.oakpark.com/News/Articles/5-31-2005/The-'underground-river'-myth-is-water-under-the-bridge/
Wasson, Isabel B. Birds. (Chicago: Follett Publishing Co., 1963)
Wasson, Isabel B. Authority versus experience.  Religious Education 23: 144–149 (Chicago: Religious Education Association, July–September 1938).
Wasson, Isabel B. What I want the schools to teach my child. Educational Trends 6(8): 14–16 (Evanston: Northwestern University, October–November 1938).

American petroleum geologists
1897 births
1994 deaths
American women geologists
American ornithologists
Women ornithologists
People from Brooklyn
Columbia Graduate School of Arts and Sciences alumni
Massachusetts Institute of Technology School of Science alumni
University of Chicago alumni
Wellesley College alumni
People from La Grange Park, Illinois
People from River Forest, Illinois
Yellowstone National Park
20th-century American geologists
20th-century American women scientists
Scientists from New York (state)
20th-century American zoologists